Colonial buildings in Bandung include those that were constructed during the Dutch colonial period of Indonesia. The period started with the founding of Bandung in the beginning of the 20th century, which is relatively young compared to other Indonesian cities. The list is divided into the colonial architectural styles: Traditionalism (before 20th century), Dutch Rationalism (1900s-1920s), and Modernism (1920s-1930s).

Colonial architecture in Bandung is dominated with Modernist architecture, apparent in buildings such as civic buildings and offices. Bandung contains one of the largest remaining collections of Modernist building (Dutch Nieuwe Bouwen) in the world. European city planning based on garden city concept were implemented in the north part of Bandung, which is still apparent today in the architecture of the residences and villas. Most buildings in Bandung are designed by architects who lived and worked in Bandung, many of them were educated in The Netherlands. Some of the architecture were influenced with Indonesian architecture, and also North-American and British-Indies influences in the Modern architecture of pre-independent Indonesia.

Below is a list of colonial buildings found in Bandung. The list is sorted alphabetically according to its official (often, local) name. The list can also be sorted to each category.

Buildings which undertook complete renovation which resulted in different form are listed separately to distinguish the different architectural form.

Traditionalism (before 20th century)
A small number of colonial buildings, mostly an original governmental function, were built in the 19th century in Neoclassical Indies Empire style (collectively known as Traditionalist movement) around the founding time of Bandung. Few early 19th-century buildings in the most developed tropical style of Indische stijl existed in Bandung, one of them is the residence of the assistant-residence, which was unfortunately demolished in 1926 for a new municipal office.

Indische Empire style continued to the early 20th century. Architect consultant 'Hulswit-Fermont, Batavia and Ed.Cuypers, Amsterdam' (Eduard Cuypers) introduced neoclassical language in the architecture of private banks. Characteristic for the architectural conception of this bank building is entrance portico with double columns crowned by composition capitals, a cornice and tympanum; the order of the facade-windows combined with columns and composition capitals.

Dutch Rationalism (1900s – 1920s)

The early 20th century was characterized by the introduction of new technological method of construction. The period saw the effect of a new beginning when the colony is exposed to private initiatives and enormous population growth. Many new private houses were built during this time all over Indonesia. The preferable architecture style were eclectic, sometimes Romantic, combination of Dutch and Javanese style.

A new style, known as Dutch Rationalism, flourished in the Netherlands as well as in the Indies; the subsequent style in the tropical climate of Indonesia is known as New Indies Style. It is largely introduced by Moojen from Batavia, who was largely influenced by the works of Berlage. The style is the result of the attempt to develop new solutions to integrate traditional precedents (classicism) with new technological possibilities. It can be described as a transitional style between Traditionalists and the Modernists.

Modernism (1920s-1930s)
The period saw the emergence of Modernism and its varieties, namely Art Deco, Nieuwe Bouwen, Amsterdam School and other variations. The same period, in 1929, Bandung approved the 'Framework plan' city planning, which covered an area of 12,758 ha, divided in plans for mainly the Northern- and partly the Southern areas of the town. This fosters the development of early 20th-century modern architecture in Bandung.

Art Deco evolved from earlier Dutch Rationalism. The form is symmetrical and exudes technological progress and glamour, with rich color and bold geometric shapes. In Bandung, Art Deco often manifested in the decorative element in the street facades, often hiding an ordinary building with a helm roof and covered with tiles; these architecture is mostly the product of rebuilding and upgrading of commercial buildings in the 1920s and 1930s.

In the following period between late 1930s and 1940s, Art Deco evolved into a new style known as Nieuwe Bouwen (Dutch term for Modernism) or Functionalism.  Instead of creating decorative style on the facade, the architect creates style in the clear arrangement of space. The preference is to use universal form such as cylinder or curving horizontal lines. No Where else in Indonesia are the influences of the 'Modern movement' in architecture observable as in the City of Bandung. Albert Aalbers is the most representative expression of Nieuwe Bouwen in Indonesia, and many of his masterpieces - such as Savoy Homann Hotel (1939), Denis Bank (1936), and the "Driekleur" (1937) - were located in Bandung. The style is characterized by its openness, its sleek facade lines, and strong spatial effect on the exterior. Bandung contains one of the largest remaining collections of Art Deco-Nieuwe Bouwen buildings in the world.

Also included in this period are those architects who implemented the principles of native art of building in Indonesia, such as those designed by Henri Maclaine Pont.

See also
List of tallest buildings in Bandung
List of churches in Indonesia
List of colonial buildings and structures in Jakarta
New Indies Style
Tropical Modernity, C.J. van Dullemen, SUN, 2010
Arsitektur Modernitas Tropis, C.J. van Dullemen, Comunitas Bambu, 2018

References

Cited works

 

 
Colonial architecture in Indonesia
Art Deco architecture in Indonesia